= Yuju Wen =

Japanese novelist

Wen Yuju (温又柔) (born 1980) is a Japanese writer of Taiwanese descent. Her name is also romanized as Wen Yourou and On, Yūjū.

She was born in Taipei to Taiwanese parents, and moved with her family to Tokyo when she was 3 years old. She graduated from Hosei University in 2006. Her books include Kokyokoraika (2009), Raifuku no ie (2011), Tatta Hitotsu no Watashi no mono dewa nai Namae (2012), and Taiwan umare Nihongo sodachi (2015). She was named as one of the best young Japanese writers by Granta magazine in 2016.
